Didar Amirali (born 22 February 1996) is a Kazakhstani karateka. He won the silver medal in the men's kumite 67 kg event at the 2018 Asian Games held in Jakarta, Indonesia.

At the 2017 Asian Karate Championships held in Astana, Kazakhstan, he won one of the bronze medals in the men's team kumite event. In 2019, he won the silver medal in the men's kumite 67 kg event.

He won one of the bronze medals in his event at the 2021 Asian Karate Championships held in Almaty, Kazakhstan.

In 2022, he competed at the 2021 Islamic Solidarity Games held in Konya, Turkey. He won one of the bronze medals in the men's kumite 67kg event at the 2022 Asian Karate Championships held in Tashkent, Uzbekistan.

Achievements

References 

Living people
1996 births
Place of birth missing (living people)
Kazakhstani male karateka
Karateka at the 2018 Asian Games
Medalists at the 2018 Asian Games
Asian Games medalists in karate
Asian Games silver medalists for Kazakhstan
Islamic Solidarity Games competitors for Kazakhstan
21st-century Kazakhstani people